Alicorp  is the largest Peruvian consumer goods company, with operations in South America.

History 
The company now known as Alicorp was started in 1956 as Industrias Teodoro Aldude and Anderson, Clayton & Co. as an oil and soap manufacturer in the port of Callao, Peru. In 1971, the Peruvian conglomerate Grupo Romero acquired Anderson, Clayton & Co. and renamed it Compañia Industrial Peru Pacifico S.A. (CIPPSA).The company survived during the years of military rule in Peru and during the 1990s, embarked on several acquisitions. In 1993, it absorbed Calixto Romero S.A. and Compañia Oleaginosa Pisco S.A. which were also owned by Grupo Romero. In 1995, it acquired La Fabril S.A., the largest food manufacturer in Peru from Grupo Bunge y Born from Argentina. CIPPSA changed its name to Consorcio de Alimentos Fabril Pacifico S.A. (CFP) in 1995.
CFP merged with Nicolini Hermanos S.A. and Compañia Molinera del Peru S.A. in 1996, and changed its name to Alicorp in 1997.

According to Ojo Público, in 2015, it concentrated 27% of the food industry in the country, with income of 1229.6 million soles.

Acquisitions 

 2001 – Acquired assets and brands owned by the Peruvian subsidiary of Unilever.
 2004 – Acquired Alimentum S.A. in order to enter the ice cream business.
 2005 – Bought a laundry plant owned by Unilever and several laundry brands.
 2006 – Acquired Asa Alimentos and Molinera Inca.
 2008 – Acquired Colombian company PROPERSA and Argentinian company The Value Brand Company.
 2010 – Acquired Argentinian company SANFORD 
 2012 – Acquired Chilean company SALMOFOOD, expanding its animal nutrition business.

Financial Results 
Alicorp achieved revenues of 896 million dollars during 2007, a 40% increase compared to 2006.Alicorp plans to boost sales to US$2 billion by 2013 based on foreign acquisitions and export projections.

Main Brands

Perú 
Cooking Oils: Primor, Capri, Cocinero, Cil, Friol
 Hair Care: Plusbelle
 Pasta: Don Vittorio, Nicolini, Lavaggi, Alianza, Espiga de Oro, Victoria
 Cookies: Casino, Glacitas, Victoria, Wazzu, Fénix, Tentación, Tejanas, Margarita, Divas, Integrackers, Choco Bum, Chomp
 Domestic Flour: Blanca Flor, Favorita
Laundry Care: Bolívar, Opal, Marsella, Trome
Spreads: Manty, Sello de Oro
Juice: Kanú, Umsha
Seasoning: AlaCena, AlaCena Tarí, Salsa Don Vittorio

Brazil 
Pastas: Santa Amália
Hair Care: Plusbelle
Chocolate Powder: Geneo

References

External links

Alicorp Website www.alicorp.com.pe

Food and drink companies of Peru